Bill Burgess (born January 26, 1941) is a former American football player and coach.  He served as the head football coach at Jacksonville State University in Jacksonville, Alabama for 12 seasons, from 1985 until 1996, compiling a record of 84–49–4.  In 1992, he led his team to a national title, winning the NCAA Division II Football Championship.

A native of Birmingham, Alabama, Burgess played fullback for the Auburn Tigers and earned an athletic letter for the 1962 season under head coach Ralph Jordan.  In 2011, he was inducted into the Division II Hall of Fame. In 2019, he was inducted in the Alabama Sports Hall of Fame. He is the father of Rick and Greg Burgess from the National Syndicated Rick and Bubba Show

Head coaching record

College

References	

1941 births
Living people
American football fullbacks
Auburn Tigers football players
Jacksonville State Gamecocks football coaches
High school football coaches in Alabama
Sportspeople from Birmingham, Alabama
Players of American football from Birmingham, Alabama